Baseball at the 1995 Summer Universiade was the second Universiade to include baseball as a contested sport. The tournament was held in Fukuoka, Japan and was won by defending champions Cuba for their second title.

Men
Eight teams participated in the men's tournament.

Teams

Pool A

Pool B

Group stage

Pool A

|}

Pool B

|}

Final stage

5th ~ 8th Place

1st ~ 4th Place

Final standing

External links
 Official results and standings

1995 in baseball
1995 Summer Universiade
1995